Roger Rabbit is the title character in the fantasy comedy film, Who Framed Roger Rabbit (1988), directed by Robert Zemeckis.

Roger Rabbit may also be:
in printed media:
 Roger Rabbit (comic book), series by Disney Comics starring characters from the 1988 film, Who Framed Roger Rabbit
 Roger Rabbit's Toontown, comic book published by Disney Comics
 Roger Rabbit: The Resurrection of Doom, a graphic novel
 Who Censored Roger Rabbit?, a mystery novel written by Gary Wolf in 1981, later adapted into the hit Touchstone film Who Framed Roger Rabbit (1988)
 Who P-P-P-Plugged Roger Rabbit? mystery/humor novel written by Gary K. Wolf released in 1991

Other uses:
 Roger Rabbit's Car Toon Spin, a "dark" amusement ride at the Disneyland theme park in Anaheim, California and Tokyo Disneyland theme park, located in Urayasu, Chiba, Japan, near Tokyo
 The Bugs Bunny Crazy Castle, known as Roger Rabbit in Japan, released in 1989 for the Family Computer Disk System
 The Roger Rabbit (dance), a popular dance move in the early 1990s
 "Roger Rabbit", song by Sleeping with Sirens from If You Were a Movie, This Would Be Your Soundtrack (2012)

See also
 
 List of Who Framed Roger Rabbit media
 Rabbit
 Roger
 Who Framed Roger Rabbit (disambiguation)